Donald Fithian Lippincott (November 16, 1893 – January 9, 1963) was an American athlete who competed in the sprint events. He competed for the United States in the 1912 Summer Olympics held in Stockholm, Sweden where he finished third in the 100 m and second in the 200 m.

Lippincott was the first record holder over 100 meters as recognised by the IAAF (then the International Amateur Athletics Federation, now known as the International Association of Athletics Federations). He set the world record in a heat of 100 m at the 1912 Olympics.

Early life 

Lippincott was a scion of a wealthy Philadelphia family., the son of Alfonse Fithian Lippincott (1855-1925).  He was a pupil at the Episcopal Academy, before attending the University of Pennsylvania.

Life as a student 

Lippincott was a successful student athlete at the University of Pennsylvania. In 1913, he equalled the world record for the 100 yards at 9.6 s and equalled Ralph Craig's record for 220 y (straight track) at 21.2 s. He also, in 1915, was a member of the Penn 4×440 y relay team that set a new world record of 3:18.0.

Lippincott also had a time recorded for 440 y of 48.0 s and, though this is a suspect timing, he was without doubt a talented performer over this distance.

During his time at university, Lippincott was a member of the varsity track team that was the dominant force in college track and field at the time, winning 3 Intercollegiate association of Amateur Athletics of America (IC4A) championships in 4 years in the period 1910–13. The team was coached by Mike Murphy who died in 1913. It is said Lippincott ran the 220 y in world record time to guarantee Murphy his last championship. In 1915, Lippincott was named captain of the track team.

Lippincott also did well in other areas of student life. He was a member of:

 Phi Kappa Beta Junior Honorary Society
 Sphinx Senior Society
 Delta Kappa Epsilon fraternity
 Canteen club

As a student athlete, he also acted as:

 head cheerleader
 member of the Board of Director of the Athletic Association

Lippincott graduated from the Wharton school at Penn with a degree in Economics in 1915.

1912 Olympics 

Lippincott had been spotted as a talent whilst a freshman at university, and was offered a place on the Olympics team if he could fund his own travel.

The story within the Lippincott family is that his mother tried to stop him travelling because she was worried about his sea voyage to Europe following the sinking of the Titanic only months before. She tried to persuade Lippincott's father to write his son a letter stating that the family business was struggling and no money for travel would be forthcoming. In the end he did raise the sponsorship money from Penn alumni and his parents relented. There is no evidence that the business was indeed struggling at the time and the family remained wealthy.

In 1912, the USA Olympic trials consisted of 3 area meets (Western, Central and Eastern) that served as guides for team selection by the USOC and the AAU in conjunction. Lippincott ran in the Eastern trials (held in Cambridge, Massachusetts, on June 8) finishing fourth in the 100 m final but was eliminated at the semi-final stage in the 200 m. In the end, Lippincott was one of eleven American athletes selected for the 100m!

100 m 

Lippincott set the world record in a heat 16 of 100 m. Richard Rau was considered to have the then unofficial world's best time of 10.5 s but this had not been properly ratified. The time was actually quoted as 10 3/5 s, as the hand watches of the day recorded race times in 1/5 (0.2) s increments. Lippincott would remain world record holder for eight years without peers (in 1920 Jackson Scholz gained a share of the record, and in 1921 Charlie Paddock recorded a new record of 10.4 s).

In the 100 m final itself there were seven false starts, one of which led to both Lippincott and the eventual winner Ralph Craig sprinting the whole length of the track. To relieve his tension at the start, Lippincott squeezed a cork that is still in the family's possession.

When the race finally got underway, George Patching from South Africa (the only non-American in the final) led until halfway, where the three Americans Craig, Lippincott and Alvah Meyer drew level. Craig then drew ahead, but it was a blanket finish and the crowd was unsure who had won. So it was left to the judges to announce the final result, Craig first, Meyer second and Lippincott third.

200 m 

In the 200 m final, Craig was too powerful for the rest for gold but Lippincott was a strong second.

4×100 m 

Lippincott was not a member of the USA team that was disqualified for exchanging outside the zone in their semi-final. The USA team with any combination of their sprinters were the overwhelming favourites for the 4 × 100 m relay title.

Later life 

After graduation in 1915, Lippincott saw war service in World War I as a lieutenant in the US Navy. After the war, he went into banking in Philadelphia, eventually becoming a broker, first with Samuel McCreery and Co. and later with Merrill Lynch.

Lippincott supported his alma mater, the University of Pennsylvania, by becoming the president of the Class of 1915, and in doing so helping to establish the "Class of ’15 Award" for the male student who excelled best both athletically and academically. He also helped to establish the annual football club dinner.

Lippincott is interred in a family plot in the Merion section of West Laurel Hill Cemetery in Bala Cynwyd, Pennsylvania.

Notes

References

Bibliography 

Duncanson, Neil, "The Fastest Men on Earth", Andre Deutsch, 2011, .
Quercetani, R. L. & Pallicca, G. (2006) A World History of Sprint Racing 1850–2005, SEP Editrice Srl, .
IAAF, Progression of IAAF World Records, 2011 Edition, Editor Imre Motrahazi, IAAF.

American male sprinters
Athletes (track and field) at the 1912 Summer Olympics
Olympic bronze medalists for the United States in track and field
Olympic silver medalists for the United States in track and field
1893 births
1963 deaths
Medalists at the 1912 Summer Olympics
United States Navy personnel of World War I
United States Navy officers